John R. Ryan (born August 15, 1945) is a retired United States Navy vice admiral who served as the Superintendent of the United States Naval Academy and as the Chancellor of the State University of New York. He most recently served as the CEO and President of Center for Creative Leadership, a non-profit organization focusing on leadership education and research.

Naval career
A native of Mountainhome, Pennsylvania, Ryan graduated from the United States Naval Academy in June 1967 with his twin brother, Vice Admiral Norbert Ryan Jr. After designation as a naval aviator, his initial assignment was to Patrol Squadron 8. From 1972 to 1975, he was assigned to the Candidate Guidance Office at the Naval Academy.

Ryan received a Master of Science Degree in Administration from George Washington University, Washington D.C. in 1975. He has also completed the program for Senior Executives in National and International Security at the John F. Kennedy School of Government, Harvard University.

Prior to the selection for flag rank, Ryan commanded Patrol Squadron 11, Patrol Squadron 31, and Patrol Wing 10. Other Shore assignments included the Strategic Concepts Group in the Office of Chief of Naval Operations, Military Assistant to the Executive Secretary in the immediate office of the Secretary of Defense, Executive Assistant to the Deputy Chief of Naval Operations (Air Warfare), and Executive Assistant to the Commander in Chief, United States Pacific Command.

Flag assignments

In March 1991, he was promoted to rear admiral and served as the Director, Logistics and Security Assistance (J4) for the Commander in Chief, U.S. Pacific Command. In August 1993, Ryan assumed his duties as Commander, Patrol Wings, U.S. Pacific Fleet/Commander, Anti-Submarine Warfare Forces, U.S. Pacific Fleet.

Ryan served as the United States Naval Academy's Superintendent for four years before retiring. He assumed his duties as the 32nd President of the State University of New York Maritime College on June 14, 2002.

Concurrent with his duties at the Maritime College, Ryan briefly filled in as Interim President of the University at Albany.

Ryan was named Acting Chancellor of the State University of New York System in April 2005. and assumed the full role in December of that year.

On March 7, 2007, Ryan announced that he would step down as Chancellor on May 31, 2007 to become the president and CEO of the Center for Creative Leadership headquartered in Greensboro, N.C. He stepped down from the role in January, 2022.

Ryan is married to the Diane L. Ryan (née Ackerman) of Bangor, Pennsylvania. They have three adult daughters: Tricia, Kelly, and Julie.

Other Activities
Ryan has served as a director of Cablevision Systems Corporation since 2002 and currently serves as Chairman of the U.S. Naval Academy Foundation Board. In 2012, Ryan received $247,508 in cash and stock for his services as a Cablevision director.

References

1945 births
Living people
United States Naval Academy alumni
United States Naval Aviators
George Washington University alumni
Harvard Kennedy School alumni
United States Navy admirals
Recipients of the Legion of Merit
Recipients of the Navy Distinguished Service Medal
Recipients of the Air Medal
Recipients of the Defense Superior Service Medal
Superintendents of the United States Naval Academy
Presidents of the State University of New York Maritime College
Presidents of University at Albany
Chancellors of the State University of New York
American nonprofit chief executives
Recipients of the Meritorious Service Medal (United States)